Street Sense is a weekly street newspaper sold by self-employed homeless distributors ("vendors") on the streets of Washington, D.C., the capital city of the United States. It is published by the 501(c)(3) nonprofit Street Sense Media, which also produces documentary filmmaking, photography, theatre, illustration and poetry. The organization says this media, most of which is created by homeless and formerly homeless people, is designed to break down stereotypes and educate the community.

Street Sense Media is a member of the International Network of Street Papers and the Institute for Nonprofit News.

Newspaper
The 16-page publication features original news reporting, opinion articles and artwork focused on issues of homelessness and poverty. It is produced by a portion of the paper's vendors, volunteer freelancers, student interns and paid staff.

Distributing the newspaper is a "no-barrier" work opportunity designed for homeless and formerly homeless people. After completion of a simple training session, vendors work as independent contractors, purchasing newspapers from the organization for a wholesale price to cover printing costs and reselling them for a marked-up "suggested donation."

A secondary goal of this model is to create conversation and build community between housed and unhoused people.

As of 2017, Street Sense Media has over 130 active vendors distributing roughly 10,000 newspapers every two-week cycle.

Media Center
Ten years after it was founded as a street newspaper, the organization began expanding into multimedia content in 2013, starting with theatre.

Street Sense Media's theatre groups — Staging Hope (inter-generational) and Devising Hope (adults) — perform original works throughout the D.C. metro area, exploring themes such as love, family, grief, and personhood.

The next year, the organization founded the nation's first homeless filmmakers cooperative, a group of homeless and formerly homeless people working together to share their experience through film. The group's first three films premiered at E St. Cinema in the spring of 2015. Two more — both directed by formerly homeless women — premiered at E St. Cinema that fall.

In 2015, Street Sense Media launched a podcast, Sounds from the Street, which featured conversations with activists, policymakers and people experiencing homelessness.

The organization's artists also produce photography, illustration and writing. Street Sense Media provides weekly courses, tailored for its homeless and formerly homeless vendors, in each type of media it produces.

History
Street Sense published its first newspaper, Street Sense, in November 2003, three months after two volunteers, Laura Thompson Osuri and Ted Henson, approached the National Coalition for the Homeless about starting a street paper in Washington, D.C.

For the first year, Street Sense operated as a project of the National Coalition, but in October 2004, the organization incorporated and moved into its own office space.

 In March 2005, Street Sense, Inc. received 501(c)(3) status, becoming an independent nonprofit organization. By November of that year, Street Sense, Inc. had formed a full board of directors and hired co-founder Laura Thompson Osuri as a full-time executive director.
 In June 2006, a story by one of the paper's vendors and the editor that exposed eviction companies that exploited homeless people for day labor was featured on the front page of The Wall Street Journal and led to a class-action lawsuit.
 In February 2007, the paper increased publication from once a month to twice a month.
 In February 2008, the organization created the David Pike Award for Excellence in Journalism to highlight strong journalistic work about homelessness and poverty and to honor the life of a former board member and volunteer. David Pike was a longtime journalist for The Washington Star who died on November 5, 2007. The awards were distributed from 2008 to 2017.
 In January 2013, the paper increased the suggested donation amount listed on the cover of each edition to $2, and the wholesale cost to vendors, listed on the inside cover, to 50 cents per newspaper. When Street Sense was founded in 2003, the paper was sold to vendors for 25 cents per newspaper and was given to customers for a suggested donation of $1. The cost for vendors rose to 35 cents in 2009 during the Great Recession, with no adjustment of the suggested donation.
 In March 2015, the organization received funding to pilot an entrepreneurship program to train its homeless and formerly homeless writers to create commercial content, such as blogs, marketing e-mails and advertising copy.
 In May 2017, the organization hired a full-time case manager to help vendors connect with resources such as housing, employment and health care. This complemented a part-time social worker who had been hired several years beforehand.
 In September 2017, the organization formally rebranded from "Street Sense, Inc." to "Street Sense Media," including a new logo, color scheme and mission statement that accounts for the new multimedia content it has evolved to produce. The next month, a digital sales application was launched to enable credit card purchases of the paper on mobile devices.
 In March 2020, Street Sense Media temporarily suspended the printing and person-to-person distribution of Street Sense due to the COVID-19 pandemic in the United States. Many street papers around the world took similar action. The organization continues to publish a digital edition of Street Sense, encouraging readers to pay its vendors as they would for a print copy of each publication using the organization's mobile app.
 In July 2020, printing and person-to-person distribution of the publication resumed.
In April 2021, Street Sense became one of five street papers internationally to produce weekly editions.
In June 2021, Street Sense became hired its first staff reporter, a collaborative position shared with fellow nonprofit news outlet The DC Line and focused on local accountability stories.

Awards
Winner
 2015 DC Commission on the Arts and Humanities: Mayor's Arts Awards — Humanitarian Highlight, recognizing the new artistic programming added to the media center in recent years
 2017 Society of Professional Journalists D.C. Pro Chapter Dateline Awards: Best Photojournalism for a weekly newspaper, recognizing photographer Benjamin Burgess
 2017 Society of Professional Journalists D.C. Pro Chapter Dateline Awards: Best Non-Breaking News for a weekly newspaper, recognizing reporter Mary Walrath
 2017 Society of Professional Journalists D.C. Pro Chapter Dateline Awards: Best Series for a weekly newspaper, recognizing reporters Michael Brice-Saddler, Katlyn Alapati, Mary Walrath, Benjamin Burgess, and Eric Falquero
 2018 Society of Professional Journalists D.C. Pro Chapter Dateline Awards: Best Photojournalism for a weekly newspaper, recognizing photographer Benjamin Burgess
 2018 International Network of Street Papers Awards: Best Breakthrough, recognizing the #MoreThanANewspaper campaign and rebrand from Street Sense to Street Sense Media
 2019 Society of Professional Journalists D.C. Pro Chapter Dateline Awards: Best Commentary and Criticism for a weekly newspaper, recognizing writers Aida Peery, Wendell Williams, and Steve Lilienthal; recognizing editors Rachel Brody, Arthur Delaney, and Sara Reardon
 2020 Society of Professional Journalists D.C. Pro Chapter Dateline Awards: Best Art/Photo Illustration for a weekly newspaper, recognizing graphic designer Megan Rogers
 2021 Society of Professional Journalists D.C. Pro Chapter Dateline Awards: The Robert D.G. Lewis Watchdog Award, recognizing editor Eric Falquero
 2021 Society of Professional Journalists D.C. Pro Chapter Dateline Awards: Best Breaking News for a weekly newspaper, recognizing reporter Sasha Polonko and editor Eric Falquero
 2021 Society of Professional Journalists D.C. Pro Chapter Dateline Awards: Best Series for a weekly newspaper, recognizing reporters Avi Bajpai, Reginald Black, and Julia Pinney
 2021 Society of Professional Journalists D.C. Pro Chapter Dateline Awards: Best Feature for a weekly newspaper, recognizing reporter Lana Green
 2021 Society of Professional Journalists D.C. Pro Chapter Dateline Awards: Best Investigative Reporting for a weekly newspaper, recognizing reporter Callan Tansill-Suddath and editor Eric Falquero
 2021 Society of Professional Journalists D.C. Pro Chapter Dateline Awards: Best Front Page Design for a weekly newspaper, recognizing designer Camille Rood and photographers Ben Cooper, T.B. Khadra, and Joseph Young

Finalist
 2016 International Network of Street Papers Awards: Finalist (Top 5) — Best Vendor Contribution, recognizing writer and illustrator Shernell Thomas, an anonymous writer and photographer and another anonymous writer
 2016 International Network of Street Papers Awards: Finalist (Top 5) — Best News Feature, recognizing reporter Sabrina Caserta
 2017 Society of Professional Journalists D.C. Pro Chapter Dateline Awards: Best Non-Breaking News for a weekly newspaper, recognizing reporter Robyn Di Giacinto
 2017 International Network of Street Papers Awards: Finalist (Top 5) — Best Project, recognizing the Digital Hope entrepreneurship program
 2017 International Network of Street Papers Awards: Nominee (Top 10) — Best Vendor Contribution, recognizing writer Eric Thompson-Bey
 2017 International Network of Street Papers Awards: Nominee (Top 10) — Best Vendor Contribution, recognizing writer Ronald Dudley, also known as "Pookanu" for his rap career
 2017 International Network of Street Papers Awards: Nominee (Top 10) — Best News Feature, recognizing writers Angie Whitehurst and Josh Maxey; recognizing photographer Ken Martin
 2017 International Network of Street Papers Awards: Nominee (Top 10) — Best Cultural Feature, recognizing writers Ronald Dudley and Eric Falquero; recognizing photographer Rodney Choice
 2018 International Network of Street Papers Awards: Finalist (Top 5) — Best Vendor Contribution, recognizing columnist Wendell Williams
 2018 International Network of Street Papers Awards: Nominee (Top 10) — Best Vendor Contribution, recognizing columnist Jeffery McNeil
 2018 International Network of Street Papers Awards: Finalist (Top 5) — Best Photograph, recognizing photographer Benjamin Burgess
 2019 Society of Professional Journalists D.C. Pro Chapter Dateline Awards: Best Feature for a weekly newspaper, recognizing writer Jeff Gray
 2019 Society of Professional Journalists D.C. Pro Chapter Dateline Awards: Best Series for a weekly newspaper, recognizing reporters Jake Maher, Eric Falquero, Olivia Richter, KJ Ward, and Samantha Caruso; recognizing photographer Benjamin Burgess
 2019 Society of Professional Journalists D.C. Pro Chapter Dateline Awards: Best Weekly Reporting Series, recognizing reporters Katie Bemb and Annie Albright
 2019 International Network of Street Papers Awards: Nominee (Top 10) — Best Vendor Contribution, recognizing poet and photographer James Davis
 2019 International Network of Street Papers Awards: Nominee (Top 10) — Best Vendor Contribution, recognizing writers Wanda Alexander, Andre Brinson, Reginald Black, Ibn Hipps, Angie Whitehurst, Jeffery McNeil, Jackie Turner, Sheila White; recognizing illustrator Ibn Hipps
 2020 Society of Professional Journalists D.C. Pro Chapter Dateline Awards: Best Feature for a weekly newspaper, recognizing reporter Reginald Black and publishing partner Law At The Margins.
 2020 Society of Professional Journalists D.C. Pro Chapter Dateline Awards: Best Non-Breaking News for a weekly newspaper, recognizing reporter Leah Potter.
 2021 Society of Professional Journalists D.C. Pro Chapter Dateline Awards: Best Non-Breaking News for a weekly newspaper, recognizing editor Jake Maher
 2021 Society of Professional Journalists D.C. Pro Chapter Dateline Awards: Best Beat Reporting for a weekly newspaper, recognizing reporters Annemarie Cuccia, Avi Bajpai, and Eunice Sung

External links
Street Sense Media official website
International Network of Street Papers

See also
 Street News
 Media in Washington, D.C.
 List of newspapers in Washington, D.C.
 DCTV (TV station)

References

Newspapers published in Washington, D.C.
Street newspapers
Publications established in 2003
2003 establishments in Washington, D.C.